John Beall may refer to:
John Yates Beall, Confederate privateer in the American Civil War, arrested and executed as a spy
J. Glenn Beall Jr. (1927–2006), American politician and businessman
Johnny Beall (1882–1926), American baseball player

See also
John Beal (disambiguation)
John Beale (disambiguation)